Friends Stand United (FSU) is an American anti-fascist, anti-racist, and anti-drug group. It was founded in the late 1980s by Elgin James in Boston, Massachusetts, evolving out of the hardcore punk scene and in particular the straight edge subculture. While originally having a reputation for fighting against Neo-Nazis and racist groups, in later years FSU members were accused of unprovoked violence and intimidation tactics. The group is classified by the Federal Bureau of Investigation (FBI) as a street gang.

History 
FSU grew out of the hardcore punk scene in Boston, Massachusetts, in the late 1980s. The group consisted primarily of members of the straight edge subculture, and while people of all races were allowed to join, members were predominantly white. The group is credited with expelling White supremacists, Neo-Nazi and other racist gangs from punk concerts in Boston in the late 1980s. According to Rolling Stone, FSU started out as "just another local [hardcore punk] crew", which were typically "fueled by young male aggression". According to Elgin James, one of the founding members, FSU "never really had a political agenda. It was more of a visceral reaction: ‘You're gonna call me a nigger? I'm gonna bash your face in with this fucking brick'." After successfully eliminating the presence of Neo-Nazis from punk concerts in Boston, Elgin and other FSU members then turned their attention on drug dealers, robbing them and giving half their money to charity.

FSU is said to have "fizzled out" after racists became less prominent in the hardcore scene, and has been described as reemerging in the mid 1990s with no clear agenda. The group began to get a reputation for becoming "the intimidating, bullying presence they once fought against". They were accused of violently confronting anyone they believed had crossed them, and of taking over and policing concerts. FSU officially stands for "Friends Stand United", however, in the punk scene it was more frequently known as "Fuck Shit Up".

By the early 2000s, there were FSU chapters in Portland Maine, Philadelphia, Chicago, Arizona, Los Angeles, Seattle, upstate New York and New Jersey, and they were considered to have about 200 members. In 2004, FSU produced an official documentary film entitled Boston Beatdown Volume II; they previously released an underground video entitled Boston Beatdown. The film interviews members including James and discusses the group's formation. According to Rolling Stone, the film contains "disturbing footage of violent beatings in and around Boston clubs, ostensibly by members of FSU". The Federal Bureau of Investigation, which classified FSU as a street gang in 2009, states that James and other FSU members "boast" about their violent methods in the film and are shown repeatedly assaulting people at hardcore punk rock concerts and on Boston streets. James has stated that FSU is different from other outlaw organizations as they are not concerned with profiting from activities. Any involvement with selling guns, drugs or prostitution will result in members being removed from the group. He insisted the group was a collection of individuals, though was described as the closest person they have to a leader.

Throughout 2005, FSU members were accused of using violence and intimidation to control hardcore punk events in Seattle on several occasions, including threatening the band Dangers over a song they had written which criticized FSU's violence and intimidation tactics; Dangers cancelled one of their concerts following threats from FSU over the song. In response to these incidents, a group of Seattle venues, bands and bookers were reported to be discussing ways to resist the group; there were calls for a complete boycott. In February 2005, six men with ties to FSU, including the president of the upstate New York chapter, were arrested following a thirty-six-year-old man being bashed to death at a concert in New York; charges were later dropped against three of the members. That December, an FSU member was shot and killed in Arizona. According to the Arizona Daily Star, armed FSU members had invaded a concert and attacked patrons, one of whom ran to his car where he retrieved a firearm and shot an FSU member who had been chasing him. In March 2006, a Seattle police spokesperson stated there were three incidents of FSU members attacking strangers for no apparent reason in recent months, and several complaints of FSU members assaulting people in a local club. In March 2006, police searched 24 men standing outside a Seattle rock club, some wearing FSU clothing, and arrested four for carrying weapons. In 2007, FSU member Alex Franklin was arrested and charged with the murder of James Morrison, following a confrontation at a punk concert in New Jersey. There is no clear agreement over the cause of the confrontation, though some media reports claimed it was due to one of Morrison's friends wearing a shirt with a Confederate flag on it.

Elgin James left FSU in 2007, stating he had "been thinking a lot about violence and responsibility" since being interviewed regarding his involvement with the group by Rolling Stone earlier that year. At the time he was the last original founding member, with previous members having left and moved on to motorcycle clubs like the Outlaws and the Mongols. In 2011, James was sentenced to one year and one day in prison for attempting to extort $5,000 from an unidentified member of the band Mest in 2005. The Mest member had been targeted and beaten by FSU several times, and Elgin approached him saying the attacks could stop if he made a $5,000 donation to FSU. Upon being sentenced, Elgin stated he had faced his "day of reckoning. ... I have accepted responsibility for my past."

References 

Gangs in Massachusetts
Anti-racist organizations in the United States
Street gangs
American vigilantes
History of Boston
Punk gangs